Stephen Seymour Norton ( in Palmyra, New York –  in Los Angeles, California) was an American cinematographer.

Filmography 
 The Silent Command (1915)
 Where Are My Children? (1916)
 Shoes (1916)
 The Double Room Mystery (1917)
 '49–'17 (1917)
 A Wife on Trial (1917)
 The Double Standard (1917)
 Wild Life (1918)
 The Grey Parasol (1918)
 Love's Prisoner (1919)
 The Follies Girl (1919)
 The Peddler of Lies (1920)
 Bubbles (1920)
 The Wolverine (1921)
 The Hunchback of Notre Dame (1923)
 Love's Whirlpool (1924)
 Another Man's Wife (1924)
 The Broken Gate (1927)
 Black Butterflies (1928))

External links

1877 births
1951 deaths
American cinematographers
People from Palmyra, New York